Blanche of Anjou (1280 – 14 October 1310) was Queen of Aragon as the second spouse of King James II of Aragon. She was a member of the Capetian House of Anjou, she is also known as Blanche of Naples. She served as Regent or "Queen-Lieutenant" of Aragon during the absence of her spouse in 1310.

Life
Blanche was the daughter of King Charles II of Naples and Mary of Hungary. Among her siblings were King Robert I of Naples, Saint Louis of Toulouse, Philip I of Taranto (titular Emperor of Constantinople), Charles Martel of Anjou (titular King of Hungary), Queen Eleanor of Sicily, and Queen Maria of Majorca. She was originally betrothed in 1290 to John I, Marquess of Montferrat. Her father was helping him defend Montferrat, hoping to make John his vassal. However, the engagement was broken off and John died childless in 1305.

The new Pope Boniface VIII, elected in 1294 at Naples under the auspices of King Charles, mediated between the latter and James II of Aragon, and the Treaty of Anagni was signed: James was to marry Blanche and was promised the investiture, by the pope, of Sardinia and Corsica, while he was to leave the Angevin a free hand in Sicily and even to assist him if the Sicilians resisted.

On 29 October or 1 November 1295 at Vilabertran, Blanche and James were married. 

Blanche died on the 14 October 1310, during her regency in the absence of James. Her death was probably linked to the birth of her daughter Violante, who was born in October 1310. Blanche was buried at Santes Creus. She was survived by her husband, children and mother.

Issue
James (b. 29 September 1296 – d. Tarragona, July 1334). James renounced his right to the throne in 1319 to become a monk. He refused to consummate his marriage to Eleanor of Castile, who later become the second wife of his brother Alfonso.
Alfonso IV of Aragon (1299 – 24 January 1336). He became the King of Aragon in 1327 and ruled until his death. He married twice: first to Teresa d'Entença and then to Eleanor of Castile after his first wife died.
Maria (b. 1299 – d. as a nun in Sijena, 1316). She married Infante Peter of Castile, son of Sancho IV of Castile.
Constance (b. Valencia, 1 April 1300 – d. Castillo de Garcia Munoz, 19 September 1327). Constance married Juan Manuel, Prince of Villena, nephew of Alfonso X of Castile.
Isabella (b. 1302 – d. Styria, 12 July 1330), she married Frederick I of Austria.
John (b. 1304 – d. Pobo, Zaragoza, 19 August 1334). John became the first Archbishop of Toledo and  Tarragona in 1318, and Patriarch of Alexandria in 1328.
Peter (b. 1305 – d. Pisa, 4 November 1381), Count of Ribagorça and Prades. Peter married Jeanne, daughter of Gaston I of Foix. Peter was the father of Eleanor, Queen of Cyprus.
Blanche (b. 1307 – d. Barcelona, 1348), Prioress of Sixena.
Ramon Berenguer (b. August 1308 – d. a priest at Barcelona, 1366), Count of Empúries and Baron of Ejerica.. Ramon married firstly Blanca, daughter of Philip I of Taranto, and secondly Maria, daughter of Jaime of Aragon.
Violante (b. Barcelona, October 1310 – d. Pedrola, 19 July 1353). She first married Philip, Despot of Romania, son of Philip I of Taranto. Her second marriage was to Lope de Luna, Lord of Segorbe.

References

Sources
Crónica de San Juan de la Peña

|-

|-

1280 births
1310 deaths
Capetian House of Anjou
Aragonese queen consorts
Countesses of Barcelona
Royal consorts of Sicily
14th-century Italian women
14th-century women rulers
13th-century people from the Kingdom of Aragon
Deaths in childbirth
13th-century Neapolitan people
Daughters of kings